Polkampally  is a village in Medchal-Malkajgiri district in Telangana, India. It falls under Moosapet mandal.

References

Villages in Medchal–Malkajgiri district